Enarotali is a town in Paniai Regency, Central Papua, Indonesia. It is located on the shore of Lake Paniai, in Western New Guinea highlands.

History 
Enarotali is considered to be the only colonial city founded by the Dutch in the interior of New Guinea before World War II. The Wissel Lakes area was not known outside New Guinea until 1937. In order to assert Dutch control over the area, a Christian mission and a radio-equipped government post were established there in May 1938.

In April 1942, Dutch New Guinea was invaded by the Japanese, thus isolating the post from the coast, although it was resupplied by seaplanes from time to time. The Dutch maintained a small force there under code-named Operation Oaktree, made up of Papuan natives led by Jean Victor de Bruijn, harassing Japanese troops based on the coast at Timoeka near Kaukenau, where the Japanese had established an airfield in December 1942. With the objective of stopping those raids and preventing eventual allied reinforcements in the highland lake regions, the Japanese occupied the village in May 1943, although it had been preventively burnt to the ground by de Bruijn and his men. De Bruijn then withdrew to the surrounding valleys,  harassing the Japanese forces occupying the lakes and gathering precious intelligence on Japanese troops in Western New Guinea, until his evacuation from the region in July 1944.
At the end of the war in late 1945, Dutch colonial administration control was restored over the area, until it was transferred to Indonesia in May 1963 along with the rest of Western New Guinea.

Geography 
It is located in the Highlands, on the shore of Lake Paniai. Its altitude is about 1750 m, located near a fertile mountain plain surrounding the lake and it is surrounded by hills and mountains. It is served by the Enarotali Airport. It is the capital of Paniai Regency, Central Papua province. The city is at present developing towards Mahdi, located 12 km to the east.

Climate
Enarotali has a subtropical highland climate (Cfb) with heavy rainfall year-round.

Population 
The population of the Paniai Regency was 170.193 in 2017, however most of them didn't live in the provincial capital, but in the countryside. The main tribes are Mee, Moni, Wolani and Dani. The former three tribes speak the Paniai Lakes languages, which is a language family named after the lakes. They depend on agriculture, including the cultivation of sweet potato and breeding livestock.

References

Populated places in Central Papua
Regency seats of Central Papua